Metcalf Hill is a mountain in the central New York region of New York by Pierstown. Metcalf Hill is named after Arunah Metcalf.

Orlando Metcalf was born on Metcalf Hill on August 17, 1797. His father Arunah Metcalf moved to Otsego County in 1794. Arunah Metcalf served as Otsego County Sheriff from 1806–1810.

References

Mountains of Otsego County, New York
Mountains of New York (state)